The Rotax 503 is a , inline 2-cylinder, two-stroke aircraft engine, built by BRP-Rotax GmbH & Co. KG of Austria for use in ultralight aircraft.

As of 2011 the Rotax 503 is no longer in production.

Design and development

The Rotax 503 is piston ported with air-cooled cylinders and heads, utilizing either an engine driven fan and cowl, or free air cooling. Lubrication is either by use of pre-mixed fuel and oil or oil injection from an externally mounted oil tank. The 503 has dual independent breakerless, magneto capacitor-discharge ignition (CDI) systems. It can be equipped with either one or two piston-type carburetors. It uses a manifold-driven pneumatic fuel pump to provide fuel pressure. An optional High Altitude Compensation kit is available.

The engine's propeller drive is via a Rotax type B, C, or E style gearbox. The standard engine includes a muffler exhaust system with an extra after-muffler as optional. The standard starter is a recoil start type, with an electric starter optional. An integral alternating current generator producing 170 watts at 12 volts with external rectifier-regulator is optional. The engine includes an intake air filter and can be fitted with an intake silencer system.

Limitations
The manufacturer acknowledges the design limitations of this engine, warning pilots:

Applications

Specifications (503)

References

External links

Air-cooled aircraft piston engines
Rotax engines
Two-stroke aircraft piston engines